Lago Trearie is a small lake in the Parco Naturale del Nebrodi in the Province of Catania, northeast of Sicily island, Italy.

Lakes of Sicily